Oscar is a small rural unincorporated community in southern Jefferson County, Oklahoma, United States, three miles north of the Red River. Named for Oscar W. Seay, rancher, the post office opened November 23, 1892. The ZIP Code is 73561.  The first Postmaster was William Riley Butler, by presidential appointment.

Sources
Shirk, George H. Oklahoma Place Names. Norman: University of Oklahoma Press, 1987.  .

Butler Family Genealogy

Unincorporated communities in Jefferson County, Oklahoma
Unincorporated communities in Oklahoma